Bari Mohamedali is a Chinese footballer who plays as a winger or right-back for Xinjiang Tianshan Leopard in China League One.

Club career
Bari was born in Fuyun, Xinjiang where both his parents worked for the local Mining Bureau, despite their meagre salary they actively encouraged their sons football development by building a small football pitch for him to train on as well as paying for football lessons. His parents encouragement would see Bari play for the Xinjiang Song Qingling Football School where he was soon scouted by the Xinjiang Men's Football Team to participate in the 2005 National Games of China. After the tournament the local Xinjiang football authority decided to participate in the 2006 professional Chinese football leagues where they entered a team called Xinjiang Sport Lottery in the third tier and used the squad that participated in the 2005 National Games of China. In the 2007 league season Bari was promoted to the senior team and aided the club to a promotion play-off position where they were knocked out in the quarter-finals. The following season saw Xinjiang unable to improve on their previous seasons results and also fail in reaching the 2009 National Games of China, which saw the management decide to disband the team.

Bari would be scouted by the football coach Wu Jingui during the 2009 National Games of China preliminary's and once he joined top tier club Hangzhou Greentown as their Head coach he would make Bari one of his first signings. He would make his debut on 27 March 2010 against Shandong Luneng where he came on as a substitute for Fan Xiaodong in a league game that ended in a 4-2 defeat. At Hangzhou Greentown Bari would be converted from a striker into a winger and go on to score his goal for the club in a league game against Henan Jianye on 31 October 2010 in a 2-0 victory. In his debut season for the club he would help guide the team to their highest position of fourth within the league and participation in the 2011 Asian Champions League while also going on to score his first continental goal in the opening game of the group stage against Nagoya Grampus scoring in their 2-0 win. On 25 October 2012, Hangzhou Greentown announced that Bari's contract with the club was terminated for disciplinary reasons, predominantly relating to absence and lateness, however Bari would claim he was involved in a contract dispute.

He then signed with Jiangsu Sainty for the 2013 season.
In February 2014，Bari  moved to China League One side Xinjiang Tianshan Leopard on a one-year loan deal. On 29 January 2016, Bari transferred to China League One club Qingdao Huanghai.

Career statistics
Statistics accurate as of match played 31 December 2020.

Honours

Club
Jiangsu Sainty
Chinese FA Cup: 2015
Chinese FA Super Cup: 2013

Qingdao Huanghai
China League One: 2019

References

External links
 
 

1989 births
Living people
Chinese footballers
Uyghur sportspeople
Chinese people of Uyghur descent
Footballers from Xinjiang
Zhejiang Professional F.C. players
People from Altay Prefecture
Jiangsu F.C. players
Xinjiang Tianshan Leopard F.C. players
Qingdao F.C. players
Chinese Super League players
China League One players
China League Two players
Association football wingers